Asymmetric follow refers to a social network allowing many people to follow an individual or account without having to follow them back. It is also known as asynchronous follow or sometimes asymmetric friendship.

Asymmetric follow is a common pattern on Twitter, where someone may have thousands of followers, but themselves follow few (or no) accounts. In September 2010 Facebook started experimenting with a similar feature, which Facebook calls "Subscribe To."

See also
 Algorithmic curation
 Algorithmic radicalization
 Friending and following
 Influence-for-hire
 Ghost followers
 Social bot
 Social influence bias
 Social media bias

References

Real-time web
Social media
Web 2.0